In mathematics, arithmetic combinatorics is a field in the intersection of number theory, combinatorics, ergodic theory and harmonic analysis.

Scope
Arithmetic combinatorics is about combinatorial estimates associated with arithmetic operations (addition, subtraction, multiplication, and division).  Additive combinatorics is the special case when only the operations of addition and subtraction are involved.

Ben Green explains arithmetic combinatorics in his review of "Additive Combinatorics" by Tao and Vu.

Important results

Szemerédi's theorem

Szemerédi's theorem is a result in arithmetic combinatorics concerning arithmetic progressions in subsets of the integers. In 1936, Erdős and Turán conjectured that every set of integers A with positive natural density contains a k term arithmetic progression for every k. This conjecture, which became Szemerédi's theorem, generalizes the statement of van der Waerden's theorem.

Green–Tao theorem and extensions

The Green–Tao theorem, proved by Ben Green and Terence Tao in 2004, states that the sequence of prime numbers contains arbitrarily long arithmetic progressions.  In other words, there exist arithmetic progressions of primes, with k terms, where k can be any natural number. The proof is an extension of Szemerédi's theorem.

In 2006, Terence Tao and Tamar Ziegler extended the result to cover polynomial progressions. More precisely, given any integer-valued polynomials P1,..., Pk in one unknown m all with constant term 0, there are infinitely many integers x, m  such that x + P1(m), ..., x + Pk(m) are simultaneously prime.  The special case when the polynomials are m, 2m, ..., km implies the previous result that there are length k arithmetic progressions of primes.

Breuillard–Green–Tao theorem

The Breuillard–Green–Tao theorem, proved by Emmanuel Breuillard, Ben Green, and Terence Tao in 2011, gives a complete classification of approximate groups. This result can be seen as a nonabelian version of Freiman's theorem, and a generalization of Gromov's theorem on groups of polynomial growth.

Example
If A is a set of N integers, how large or small can the sumset

the difference set

and the product set

be, and how are the sizes of these sets related?  (Not to be confused: the terms difference set and product set can have other meanings.)

Extensions
The sets being studied may also be subsets of algebraic structures other than the integers, for example, groups, rings and fields.

See also
Additive number theory
Approximate group
Corners theorem
Ergodic Ramsey theory
Problems involving arithmetic progressions

Schnirelmann density
Shapley–Folkman lemma
Sidon set
Sum-free set
Sum-product problem

Notes

References
 
Additive Combinatorics and Theoretical Computer Science, Luca Trevisan, SIGACT News, June 2009

Open problems in additive combinatorics, E Croot, V Lev
From Rotating Needles to Stability of Waves: Emerging Connections between Combinatorics, Analysis, and PDE, Terence Tao, AMS Notices March 2001

Further reading
Some Highlights of Arithmetic Combinatorics, resources by Terence Tao
Additive Combinatorics: Winter 2007, K Soundararajan
Earliest Connections of Additive Combinatorics and Computer Science, Luca Trevisan

Additive number theory
Sumsets
Harmonic analysis
Ergodic theory
Additive combinatorics